Met Operations, also known as Met Ops, is one of the four business groups which forms the Metropolitan Police Service and is responsible for providing operational support services.. It was created during the 2018-19 restructuring of the service, amalgamating many of its functions from the Operations side of the Specialist Crime & Operations Directorate formed in 2012, with the Specialist Crime side of that Directorate placed under the new Frontline Policing Directorate. The group is currently led by Temporary Assistant Commissioner Matt Twist.

It consists of several branches:
Met Ops Chief Officer Team (MO1)
Met Intelligence (MO2)
Covert Policing (MO3)
Forensic Services (MO4)
Covert Governance (MO5)
Public Order Planning (MO6)
Taskforce (MO7)
Territorial Support Group
Marine Policing Unit
Dog Support Unit
Mounted Branch
Roads and Transport Policing Command (MO8)
Met Detention (MO9)
Met Prosecutions (MO10)
Operational Support Services (MO11)
MetCC (MO12)
Specialist Firearms Command (MO19)

References

Metropolitan Police units